The parks of Genoa are for the most part green areas comprising the gardens of aristocratic villas and some adjoining open land.

The largest park of the town is the system of the Parks of the Forts, while the most famous and renowned are the Parks of Nervi, bordered by the Anita Garibaldi promenade. In the city centre, in addition to the hanging gardens of  historic palaces, the Parks of Piazza Corvetto and Groppallo Park are the most attended (the latter is open to the public only on particular occasions).

The Parks of the Forts 

A natural complex formed by the continuity of two parks adjoining the urban walls and the hill area of the defence forts nearly encircles the city. It is one of the widest urban natural areas of Italy, encompassing 611.69 hectares.

The Parks of Nervi 

The parks of Nervi are best known for the botanic complex of the city adjoining the Anita Garibaldi promenade, formed by the joining of the gardens of different historic villas, and include:

Parks of the city's North and Centre

Parks of the City's West

Parks of the City's East

Regional Parks 

 Natural Park of Mount Antola
 Natural Park of Mount Aveto
 Natural Park of Mount Beigua
 Natural Park of Bric Tana
 Natural Park of Porto Venere
 Natural Park of Montemarcello – Magra
 Natural Park of Piana Crixia

National Parks 
 Natural Park of Portofino

Parks
Genoa, Parks of